This is a list of current and former Roman Catholic churches in the Roman Catholic Diocese of Gaylord. The diocese is located in the northern portion of Michigan's lower peninsula and includes the cities of Gaylord, Traverse City, Alpena, Manistee and Petoskey.

The cathedral church of the diocese is the St. Mary, Our Lady of Mount Carmel Cathedral in Gaylord.

Central Region

East Region

North Region

Southeast Region

Southwest Region

West Region

References

 
Gaylord